Jon Moncayola Tollar (born 13 May 1998) is a Spanish professional footballer who plays as a central midfielder for CA Osasuna.

Club career
Moncayola was born in Garínoain, Navarre, and was a CA Osasuna youth graduate having joined the club aged 10. Not initially marked out as a top prospect, he made his senior debut with the farm team in the 2017–18 season, in Tercera División; during that campaign he also appeared with the reserves in Segunda División B, and spent the next season with them but at the lower Tercera level following relegation – they regained their Segunda B status at the first attempt.

On 3 June 2019, Moncayola renewed his contract with the Pamplona club until 2021. He made his professional – and La Liga – debut on 17 August 2019, starting in a 1–0 away defeat of CD Leganés.

On 28 November 2019, Moncayola further extended his contract until 2024, and scored his first professional goal three days later, netting his team's third in a 4–2 away defeat of RCD Espanyol.

On 8 June 2021, Moncayola signed a new ten-year contract with Osasuna, running until June 2031. Osasuna also confirmed that his release clause would be €22m (£18.9m) for the next two seasons, before being reduced to €20m for the eight following campaigns, and €8m if the club was relegated.

International career
Moncayola featured in all three of Spain's U-21 group stage fixtures at the European Championship in March 2021. He missed the knock-out stage of the tournament in May 2021 due to testing positive for COVID-19.

Career statistics

Honours
Spain U23
Summer Olympic silver medal: 2020

References

External links

1998 births
Living people
People from Tafalla (comarca)
Spanish footballers
Footballers from Navarre
Association football midfielders
La Liga players
Segunda División B players
Tercera División players
CA Osasuna B players
CA Osasuna players
Spain under-21 international footballers
Olympic footballers of Spain
Footballers at the 2020 Summer Olympics
Olympic medalists in football
Olympic silver medalists for Spain
Medalists at the 2020 Summer Olympics